Leandro Lima may refer to:

 Leandro Lima (actor) (born 1982), Brazilian model and actor
 Leandro Lima (footballer) (born 1985), Brazilian footballer